Anatoly Stepanovich Vedyakov (21 December 1930 – 2009) was a Soviet racewalker. He competed in the men's 20 kilometres walk and men's 50 kilometres walk  at the 1960 Summer Olympics in Rome and in the men's 50 kilometres walk at the 1964 Summer Olympics in Tokyo.

References

External links
 

1930 births
2009 deaths
Athletes (track and field) at the 1960 Summer Olympics
Athletes (track and field) at the 1964 Summer Olympics
Soviet male racewalkers
Olympic athletes of the Soviet Union
Place of birth missing